Stulić or Štulić  may refer to:

Branimir Štulić (born 1953), Yugoslavian singer, songwriter, poet and a leader of a former rock group Azra
Joakim Stulić (1730–1817), lexicographer from the Republic of Ragusa, author of the biggest dictionary in the older Croatian lexicography
Luko Stulić (1772–1828), scientist from the Republic of Ragusa who first made epidemiological studies of heritable skin disorders
Nikola Štulić (born 2001), Serbian footballer

Croatian surnames